Terry Hart is an astronaut.

Terry or Teri Hart may also refer to:

Terry Hart (ice hockey), 1968–69 MJHL season